Nayobe Catalina Gomez, known professionally as Nayobe (born December 18, 1967, in Brooklyn, New York), is an American singer of Afro-Rican heritage and freestyle dance-pop musician. Her most successful singles are "Good Things Come to Those Who Wait", "Second Chance for Love" and "It's Too Late", which reached positions Nos. 15, 30 and 5 on the Billboard Hot Dance Club Songs chart, respectively.

Career

In the early part of 1985, Nayobe became the first Latin American female to record a freestyle song called "Please Don't Go", produced by Andy Panda. Some music critics declared her record the first song of the genre and of the whole Latin hip hop movement which later became known as freestyle music. Nayobe's other hits include "Guess I Fell In Love", "Good Things Come to Those Who Wait", "Second Chance for Love" and "Promise Me". Her second album, Promise Me, took her into a more urban contemporary and new jack swing direction with production by Teddy Riley. Nayobe returned with the self-titled salsa album in 1999.

Discography

Studio albums

Singles

 1984: "Please Don't Go"
 1985: "School Girl Crush" 
 1985: "No Te Vayas" 
 1986: "Good Things Come To Those Who Wait" 
 1986: "Second Chance For Love" 
 1987: "Guess I Feel In Love"
 1988: "It's Too Late"
 1989: "Please Don't Go/ No Te Vayas"
 1990: "I'll Be Around"
 1990: "I Love The Way You Love Me" 
 1995: "All Night Long"
 1997: "We Can Dance, We Can Fly"
 1999: "Como Una Loba"

References

External links
 Nayobe Web Site
 on Discogs

1967 births
Living people
American dance musicians
American women pop singers
American freestyle musicians
American people of Cuban descent
Musicians from Brooklyn
21st-century American women